Grider is an unincorporated community in Cumberland County, Kentucky, United States. It lies along Kentucky Route 90, west of the city of Burkesville, the county seat of Cumberland County.  Its elevation is 617 feet (188 m).

References

Unincorporated communities in Cumberland County, Kentucky
Unincorporated communities in Kentucky